La’Neishea Caufield (born May 25, 1980) is an American former professional basketball player who played for the Utah Starzz of the WNBA. She played eight games. She was named Big 12 Player of the Week in the 2001 season.

Oklahoma statistics
Source

References

External links
WNBA.com: LaNeishea Caufield Player Info

1980 births
Living people
American women's basketball players
Basketball players from Oklahoma
Oklahoma Sooners women's basketball players
People from Ada, Oklahoma
Utah Starzz draft picks
Utah Starzz players
Guards (basketball)